The Administration Building, Carnegie Institute of Washington is a Beaux-Arts style building designed by architects Carrere and Hastings, and located at 1530 P Street NW in Washington, D.C.  It houses the Carnegie Institution for Science, a philanthropic scientific research organization founded in 1902 by Andrew Carnegie.  In recognition of the building's architecture and its unique tenant, the building was declared a National Historic Landmark in 1965.  The building was also designated a contributing property to the Sixteenth Street Historic District in 1978.

Description and history
The Carnegie Institution for Science, formerly known as the Carnegie Institute of Washington, is located in Washington's Dupont Circle neighborhood, north of Scott Circle at the southeast corner of 16th and P Streets NW.  It is a large and roughly rectangular structure, two stories in height, its exterior finished in Indiana limestone.  Facing west toward 16th Street is its monumental front facade, with ten full-height Ionic columns (six in front and four in the center) supporting an entablature and flat balustraded roof.  The original main building was basically square, with small flanking wings.  To this a rear addition was made in 1937, using similar materials and design.  The interior houses offices and meeting spaces, as well as a 450-seat auditorium.

Andrew Carnegie established the Carnegie Institute of Washington in 1902 with an endowment of $10 million.  The front portion of the building, designed by Carrere and Hastings, was built in 1910, and the rear addition, built in 1937, was designed by William Adams Delano.  The building presently houses administrative functions of the Institute, which has its primary research functions elsewhere.  The organization's mission is to fund talented individuals so that they can perform basic research for the betterment of mankind without significant constraints.

On April 2, 2021 Carnegie president Eric Isaacs announced that the building has been sold to Qatar for an undisclosed sum.

See also
List of National Historic Landmarks in Washington, D.C.
National Register of Historic Places listings in the upper NW Quadrant of Washington, D.C.

References

External links
Carnegie Institution for Science

Buildings and structures in Washington, D.C.
Dupont Circle
Buildings and structures completed in 1910
National Historic Landmarks in Washington, D.C.
Carrère and Hastings buildings
Beaux-Arts architecture in Washington, D.C.
Neoclassical architecture in Washington, D.C.